Tajura Aceh Football Club (simply known as Tajura Aceh FC) is an Indonesian football club based in Southwest Aceh Regency, Aceh. They currently compete in the Liga 3 and their homeground is Putroe Aloh Stadium.

Honours
 Soeratin Cup Aceh U17
 Champion: 2021

References

External links
Tajura Aceh FC Instagram

Southwest Aceh Regency
Football clubs in Indonesia
 Football clubs in Aceh
Association football clubs established in 2020
2020 establishments in Indonesia